John Turnbull may refer to:

Jack Turnbull (footballer) (1885–1917), Australian rules footballer
Jack Turnbull (1910–1944), American lacrosse player
John E. Turnbull, Canadian inventor of the first rolling wringer clothes washer, 1843
John Turnbull (voyager), English explorer to the Pacific in 1800–1805
John Turnbull (actor) (1880–1956), British film actor
John Turnbull (priest) (1905–1979), English Anglican priest
John Turnbull (cricketer) (born 1935), New Zealand cricketer
John Turnbull (musician) (born 1950), English pop and rock guitarist and singer
John W. Turnbull (born 1936), Canadian politician in the Legislative Assembly of New Brunswick